Maryna Proskurina (born ) is a former Ukrainian female artistic gymnast who represented her nation at international competitions.

She participated at the 2008 Summer Olympics in Beijing, China, and the 2007 World Artistic Gymnastics Championships. Her floor was choreographed by Oksana Omelianchik.

See also 
 List of Olympic female artistic gymnasts for Ukraine

References

External links
Maryna Proskurina at Sports Reference
http://www.intlgymnast.com/index.php?option=com_content&view=article&catid=58%3AUkraine&id=499&Itemid=53
http://actionplusps.photoshelter.com/image/I00008EUrVIycfK0
https://www.youtube.com/watch?v=2xJ0U46ToWs

1985 births
Living people
Ukrainian female artistic gymnasts
Place of birth missing (living people)
Olympic gymnasts of Ukraine
Gymnasts at the 2008 Summer Olympics
Universiade silver medalists for Ukraine
Universiade medalists in gymnastics
21st-century Ukrainian women